Gary Fisher (born 6 June 1992) is a Scottish professional footballer who plays as a midfielder.

Career
Fisher made his senior debut for Kilmarnock during the 2010–11 season, and spent a loan spell at Cowdenbeath. Fisher would sign a long-term contract, which keep him until 2015. He joined Hamilton Academical on loan in August 2012; the loan deal was extended in January 2013. Following a win at home against league leaders Morton, Fisher commented that he thought the victory would act as a "springboard" for the club in the latter stages of the season. At the end of the 2012–13 season, Fisher returned to the club.

In 2013–14 season, Fisher joined East Fife on an emergency one-month loan deal. Fisher soon made an immediate impact by scoring on his debut, in a 1–0 win over Stenhousemuir. After making a few appearances at East Fife, Kilmarnock released five players, including Fisher. Following his release, Fisher joined East Fife on a free transfer.

Fisher signed for Albion Rovers in June 2014. Fisher left Rovers in 2019.

Career statistics

Personal life
Fisher and his family support Celtic.

References

1992 births
Living people
Scottish footballers
Kilmarnock F.C. players
Cowdenbeath F.C. players
Hamilton Academical F.C. players
Scottish Premier League players
Scottish Football League players
Scottish Professional Football League players
East Fife F.C. players
Albion Rovers F.C. players
Association football midfielders